Inscape, of the pair inscape and instress, is a literary and philosophical concept proposed by British poet Gerard Manley Hopkins.

Inscape may also refer to:
 Inscape (album), the 2018 album from Canadian composer Alexandra Stréliski
 Inscape (company), a short-lived publisher of video games in the 1990s
 Inscape (Copland), a 1967 musical composition by Aaron Copland
 Inscape (visual art), an artistic term conveying the notion of an artist's psyche as an interior landscape